Neil Ellett (born in Richmond, British Columbia) was a Canadian soccer player who spent his career with Vancouver teams, including the Vancouver Whitecaps of the North American Soccer League.  He also played for the member of the Canadian national and Olympic soccer teams.

Club career
Neil Ellett graduated from Burnaby North Secondary School.  He began playing for Vancouver North Shore of the Pacific Coast Soccer League when he was seventeen.  He played at least one season (1969–70) in the Pacific Coast Soccer League (when the league was amateur) with soccer club Croatia S.C.  He also played for  Vancouver Eintracht.  Ellett was an original member of the Vancouver Whitecaps, playing with the team in 1974 and 1975.  His only Whitecap goal was the first scored by the team in their history, on May 4, 1974 at Empire Stadium.

National team
From 1967 to 1973, Ellett made 12 "B" (Olympic) and seven "A" appearances for Canada. He was part of Canada's Pan American Games team in 1967 and 1971 as well as the Olympic Qualifying team in 1971. In a memorable CONCACAF Olympic Qualifying match at Empire Stadium in Vancouver, he scored the lone goal on a header in a 1–0 win over Mexico. He also participated in one round of FIFA World Cup Qualifiers in 1972 (he was 27 years old when he made his debut at the "A" level).

Referee
Ellett is currently a soccer referee and a National referee assessor in British Columbia.

He was inducted into the Burnaby Sports Hall of Fame in 2007.  He is also a member of the Canadian Soccer Hall of Fame.

References

External links
 / Canada Soccer Hall of Fame
 NASL stats

1944 births
Living people
Soccer people from British Columbia
Canada men's international soccer players
Canadian soccer players
Canada Soccer Hall of Fame inductees
Association football defenders
Association football midfielders
Association football utility players
North American Soccer League (1968–1984) players
North American Soccer League (1968–1984) indoor players
People from Richmond, British Columbia
Vancouver North Shore United players
Vancouver Whitecaps (1974–1984) players
Pan American Games competitors for Canada
Footballers at the 1967 Pan American Games
Footballers at the 1971 Pan American Games